Mikael Fortelius (born 1 February 1954) is a Professor of Evolutionary Palaeontology  at the University of Helsinki and the coordinator of the Neogene of the Old World database of fossil mammals.  His research involves the evolution of Eurasian land mammals and terrestrial environments during the Neogene, ecomorphology of ungulates, developmental biology, the function and evolution of mammalian teeth, and scaling problems (changes in size with growth or as species evolve). He is an expert on indricotheres. He has authored and co-authored a number of papers in peer-reviewed international journals as well as articles on popular science and other published material.  He is married to Asta Irene Rosenström, and he has three children.

External links
Mikael Fortelius' home page
How Do We Know? Answers from Dr. Mikael Fortelius
An article by M. Fortelius in Nature

1954 births
Living people
Finnish paleontologists
Academic staff of the University of Helsinki